In mathematics, the Henstock–Kurzweil integral or generalized Riemann integral or gauge integral – also known as the (narrow) Denjoy integral (pronounced ), Luzin integral or Perron integral, but not to be confused with the more general wide Denjoy integral – is one of a number of inequivalent definitions of the integral of a function. It is a generalization of the Riemann integral, and in some situations is more general than the Lebesgue integral.  In particular, a function is Lebesgue integrable if and only if the function and its absolute value are Henstock–Kurzweil integrable. 

This integral was first defined by Arnaud Denjoy (1912). Denjoy was interested in a definition that would allow one to integrate functions like

This function has a singularity at 0, and is not Lebesgue integrable. However, it seems natural to calculate its integral except over the interval  and then let .

Trying to create a general theory, Denjoy used transfinite induction over the possible types of singularities, which made the definition quite complicated. Other definitions were given by Nikolai Luzin (using variations on the notions of absolute continuity), and by Oskar Perron, who was interested in continuous major and minor functions. It took a while to understand that the Perron and Denjoy integrals are actually identical.

Later, in 1957, the Czech mathematician Jaroslav Kurzweil discovered a new definition of this integral elegantly similar in nature to Riemann's original definition which he named the gauge integral. Ralph Henstock independently introduced a similar integral that extended the theory in 1961, citing his investigations of Ward's extensions to the Perron integral. Due to these two important contributions, it is now commonly known as the Henstock–Kurzweil integral. The simplicity of Kurzweil's definition made some educators advocate that this integral should replace the Riemann integral in introductory calculus courses.

Definition

together with each subinterval's tag defined as a point

we define the Riemann sum for a function  to be

where  This is the summation of each subinterval's length multiplied by the function evaluated at that subinterval's tag.

Given a positive function

which we call a gauge, we say a tagged partition P is -fine if

We now define a number  to be the Henstock–Kurzweil integral of  if for every  there exists a gauge  such that whenever  is -fine, we have

Cousin's theorem states that for every gauge , such a -fine partition P does exist, so this condition cannot be satisfied vacuously. The Riemann integral can be regarded as the special case where we only allow constant gauges.

Properties

Let  be any function.

Henstock–Kurzweil integrals are linear.

If f is Riemann or Lebesgue integrable, then it is also Henstock–Kurzweil integrable, and calculating that integral gives the same result by all three formulations. The important Hake's theorem states that

whenever either side of the equation exists, and likewise symmetrically for the lower integration bound. This means that if  is "improperly Henstock–Kurzweil integrable", then it is properly Henstock–Kurzweil integrable; in particular, improper Riemann or Lebesgue integrals of types such as

are also proper Henstock–Kurzweil integrals. To study an "improper Henstock–Kurzweil integral" with finite bounds would not be meaningful. However, it does make sense to consider improper Henstock–Kurzweil integrals with infinite bounds such as

For many types of functions the Henstock–Kurzweil integral is no more general than Lebesgue integral. For example, if  is bounded with compact support, the following are equivalent:
 is Henstock–Kurzweil integrable,
 is Lebesgue integrable,
 is Lebesgue measurable.
This means that the Henstock–Kurzweil integral can be thought of as a "non-absolutely convergent version of the Lebesgue integral".

If F is differentiable everywhere (or with countably many exceptions), the derivative F′ is Henstock–Kurzweil integrable, and its indefinite Henstock–Kurzweil integral is F.  (Note that F′ need not be Lebesgue integrable.) In other words, we obtain a simpler and more satisfactory version of the second fundamental theorem of calculus: each differentiable function is, up to a constant, the integral of its derivative:

The space of all Henstock–Kurzweil-integrable functions is often endowed with the Alexiewicz norm, with respect to which it is barrelled but incomplete.

Utility
The gauge integral has increased utility when compared to the Riemann Integral in that the gauge integral of any function  which has a constant value c except possibly at a countable number of points  can be calculated. Consider for example the piece-wise function   

  

This function is impossible to integrate using a Riemann Integral because it is impossible to make intervals  small enough to encapsulate the changing values of f(x). With the mapping nature of -fine tagged partitions.  

Consider that  

where  represents the length of interval . Note this equivalence is established because the summation of the differences in length of all intervals  is equal to the length of the interval (or ).  

By the definition of the gauge integral, we want to show that the above equation is less than any given . This produces two cases:   

If this term is zero, then for any interval length, the following inequality will be true:  

Since we know  is  -fine, the inequality   
  
holds because the length of any interval  is shorter than its covering by the definition of being -fine. If we can construct an  out of the right side of the inequality, then we can show the criteria are met for an integral to exist.  

To do this, let  and set our covering gauges , which makes  

From this, we have that   
  

Because   
  
as a geometric series.

McShane integral
Lebesgue integral on a line can also be presented in a similar fashion.

If we take the definition of the Henstock–Kurzweil integral from above, and we drop the condition

then we get a definition of the McShane integral, which is equivalent to the Lebesgue integral. Note that the condition

See also
Pfeffer integral
Cauchy principal value
Hadamard finite part integral

References

Footnotes

General
 
 A Modern Integration Theory in 21st Century

External links
The following are additional resources on the web for learning more:
 
 An Introduction to The Gauge Integral
 An Open Suggestion: To replace the Riemann integral with the gauge integral in calculus textbooks signed by Bartle, Henstock, Kurzweil, Schechter, Schwabik, and Výborný

Definitions of mathematical integration